Ikeda Station is the name of four train stations in Japan:

 Ikeda Station (Hokkaidō) in Ikeda, Hokkaidō on the JR Nemuro Main Line
 Ikeda Station (Osaka) in Ikeda, Osaka on the Hankyū Takarazuka Main Line
 Ikeda Station (Kumamoto) in Kumamoto, Kumamoto on the Kumamoto Dentetsu Kikuchi Line
 Awa-Ikeda Station in Miyoshi, Tokushima on the JR Dosan Line